Luiz Daniel (born 29 September 1936) is a Brazilian water polo player. He competed at the 1960 Summer Olympics and the 1964 Summer Olympics. Daniel was also a member of Brazil's bronze medal winning team at the 1959 Pan American Games and the gold medal winning team at the 1963 Pan American Games.

See also
 Brazil men's Olympic water polo team records and statistics
 List of men's Olympic water polo tournament goalkeepers

References

External links
 

1936 births
Living people
Brazilian male water polo players
Water polo goalkeepers
Olympic water polo players of Brazil
Water polo players at the 1960 Summer Olympics
Water polo players at the 1964 Summer Olympics
Pan American Games gold medalists for Brazil
Pan American Games bronze medalists for Brazil
Pan American Games medalists in water polo
Water polo players from São Paulo
Competitors at the 1959 Pan American Games
Water polo players at the 1963 Pan American Games
Medalists at the 1959 Pan American Games
Medalists at the 1963 Pan American Games
20th-century Brazilian people